The 2016–17 Slovenian Futsal League season (also known as the 1. SFL) was the 22nd edition of the Futsal League since its establishment in 1995. The regular season started on 23 September 2016 and concluded on 10 March 2017. The championship play-offs were played after the end of the regular season.

Brezje Maribor were the defending champions by defeating Litija in the finals of the 2015–16 season, winning its first title. They successfully defended the title, again defeating Litija 3–1 in the finals, to win their second consecutive title.

Competition format
Each team played a total of 18 matches (9 home and 9 away) in the regular season. Teams played two matches against each other (1 home and 1 away).

Teams

A total of 10 teams contested the league, including eight from the previous season and two promoted from the Second League. Tomaž won direct promotion as the winners of the 2015–16 Second League. The play-off for the final spot in the top division was played between Ajdovščina and Zavas Siliko. Zavas won the play-off fixture with the score 5–3 on aggregate and promoted to the First League for the 2016–17 season.

Regular season

Standings

Results

Championship play-offs

Bracket
Quarter-finals were played in a best-of-three series, while the semi-finals and the final were played in a best-of-five series.

Quarter-finals

First match

Second match

Third match

Semi-finals

First match

Second match

Third match

Fourth match

Final

First match

Second match

Third match

Fourth match

Third place match

|}

Relegation play-off

|}

Statistics

Top scorers

Source: Futsal NZS

See also
2016–17 Slovenian Futsal Cup

References
General

Specific

External links
Official website  
Season at UEFA

Slovenian Futsal League
Slovenia